Siu Lun may refer to:

Places 

 Siu Lun Court, a public housing estate in Tuen Mun, Hong Kong
 Siu Lun stop, an MTR Light Rail stop adjacent to the estate

People 

 Deric Wan Siu-lun (born 1964), Hong Kong actor